The India men's national volleyball team represents India in international volleyball competitions. It is managed by the Volleyball Federation of India and is currently sponsored by Sahara India Pariwar and Asics.

The Indian volleyball team has had a rollercoaster ride in its history. Although they have never qualified for the Olympics, they have appeared in the World Championship twice.

Despite having little to no presence at the world stage in its history, the team has enjoyed some success at the continental level by clinching a silver medal and two bronze medals at the Asian Games. After the decline post 1980s, the team has fared well at the recently introduced Asian Cup competition, receiving a silver and a bronze medal so far.

History

Pre-Independence
Though the game was played informally for a long time, the first interstate volleyball tournament was held in 1936 by the Indian Olympic Association (IOA).

Establishment
In 1951, the formation of Volleyball Federation of India gave the sport a better structure and the interstate tournament evolved into the senior national championship with the first edition being held in 1952. This platform gave birth to many talents who went on to represent India at the international level.

Golden years (1952–1962)
India had immediate success after formation as they made their debut in FIVB Volleyball Men's World Championship's 1952 edition. After losing to France and Czechoslovakia by comfortable 3–0 margins in the first round, they made a comeback in the 7th–8th placing round as they beat Finland, Lebanon and Israel to clinch the 8th spot.

In 1955, India won the Asian Volleyball Tournament which was held in Tokyo. Three years later, the Gurudev Singh led team won the bronze medal at the 1958 Asian Games. They beat Hong Kong and the Philippines in three straight sets but could not get past volleyball powerhouses Iran and Japan, though they managed to win a set against each.

In the 1962 Asian Games they managed to go one step ahead as they began their campaign with four consecutive wins against Burma(twice), Cambodia and Pakistan. Their old rivals Japan got the better of them in what was a five set thriller, with Japan winning the final set by 15–12 margin. This team was led by legendary players Nripjit Singh Bedi and A. Palaniswamy, both Arjuna Award winners, who had graduated to the senior team, which was then led by TP Padmanabhan Nair, who was also a part of the 1958 team. India has to settle for the Silver Medal which is currently their highest achievement ever at the Asian Games.

The finest era (1960s–1980s)

After a memorable outing at the 1962 Asian Games, India finished fourth and fifth at the 1966 and 1974 Asian Games respectively, not making it to the 1970 edition in between.

India did not enter into the inaugural Asian men's volleyball championship in 1975 but made their debut in the following tournament in 1979 where they finished fifth. In the 1978 Asian Games in Bangkok and at the 1982 Asian Games at home in New Delhi, the Indian volleyball team saw another upswing after finishing seventh and fourth respectively, falling just short of a medal in 1982 edition after they finished at the bottom of the table among four teams in the final round, going down to the heavyweights South Korea and China in straight sets.

In the following year at the Asian Volleyball Championship in Tokyo, India finished fifth yet again without any medal. However, the wait for a medal would not last too long.

In the 1986 Asian Games India sent arguably its best team ever. Led by Cyril Valloor, the team boasted the presence of former national coach GE Sridharan, K Udayakumar, who later went on to captain the Indian volleyball team, Abdul Basith, Dalel Singh and PV Ramana, father of Indian badminton star PV Sindhu.

All of them were Arjuna awardees but the most special of them all and the team's lynchpin was the talented Jimmy George, an Arjuna winner himself and a legend of Indian volleyball. He had been tearing up the national circuit for a decade and also had stints at clubs in Italy, one of the best leagues in that era, along with GE Sridharan.

Jimmy George towered at a height of 6’2" and had the advantage of graceful jumps. His ability in the air for a fraction of a second longer helped him in his smashes, all of which were very powerful thanks to his larger frame.

All of these factors combined well together and the Indian volleyball team started the Asian Games with four victories – against Hong Kong, Bahrain, Saudi Arabia and Indonesia.

Later in the games, they went down to the home team South Korea, who went on to register another victory later, but in between the Indian volleyball team finally managed to beat powerhouses Japan, more impressively in straight sets, facilitated by Jimmy George's tremendous drive. However, they could not sustain the momentum, as they fell to eventual champions China, to end up with bronze medal.

Decline (1990s–2000s)

The general popularity of the sport in the country declined in the years to follow as in-fighting within federations coincided with the death of Jimmy George in an accident in 1987 and adding to it was the rise of the Indian national cricket team as a powerhouse.

The Indian volleyball men and women's teams dominated the South Asian Federation Games in the nineties, winning three medals each, but it did not spark a revival, with subpar performances to follow at the 2006 and 2010 by the men after they came at ninth and sixth respectively.

However, they finished fourth in the 2005 Asian Men's Volleyball Championship which is currently their highest ever finish at this tournament. They went all the way to semi-finals where they lost in straight sets against Japan and then went down to South Korea in third place match losing with a margin of three sets to one.

2010–present

The 2010 and 2014 editions of the Asian Games provided some respite as the Indian volleyball men's team finished a respectable fifth with modern-day stars and inspirational captains Sinnadu Prabhagaran and Mohan Ukkrapandian leading the way.
The team also played at the Asian Cup, where they achieved some fine results, capturing bronze medal at the 2010 Asian Cup and reached all the way to the final of the 2014 Asian Cup by defeating Japan in the group stage, the top Asian team Iran in the semi-final before succumbing to South Korea with a margin of three sets to one. Besides couple of good performances at the Asian level, the team also managed to claim a gold medal at the 2010 South Asian Games.

The Indian volleyball men's team was ranked 34th in 2014, their best in the world, they also managed to win a gold medal eighth gold medal at 2016 South Asian Games, but just as it seemed that the sport was picking up again, an internal dispute in the VFI meant that it was banned from the International Volleyball Federation (FIVB) for two years till 2018.

It meant that Indian volleyball players could not travel to other leagues to play, which affected the exposure to different styles, a factor which coach GE Sridharan felt led to a 12th place finish at the 2018 Asian Games.

However, things are looking up again. The Pro Volleyball League, a franchise-based tournament was started in 2019 and it was a resounding success, made more memorable by the appearance of stars like American David Lee, an Olympic gold medallist in 2008. India also gained their ninth and seventh successive gold medal at the South Asian Games in 2019.

Though the men's Indian volleyball team won't be in Tokyo following their loss in the Olympic qualification tournament, with the renewed interest in the sport thanks to the new franchise league and Haikyuu!! anime, the nation could see the upswing in the next few years.

Notable players and past squads
Balwant Singh
Riaz Ahmed
Abdul Basith
Jimmy George
K. Udayakumar
Cyril C. Valloor
Shyam Sunder Rao
A. Ramana Rao
Tom Joseph
G. E. Sridharan
Anup D'Costa
Kirtesh Kumar Trivedi
K. J. Kapil Dev
Tilakam Gopal
Nihal Jadav
Naveen Raja Jacob
Sandeep Sharma
Suresh Kumar Mishra
Ranvir Singh
A. Palanisamy
R. K. Purohit
Yejju Subba Rao
Benjaminwalter J. Medari
T.P.Padmanabhan Nair
Sulaiman
Kuldip Chand Chopra

1958 Asian Games squad
T. R. Arunchalam, S. L. Gupta, Bharatan Nair, T. P. Padmanabhan Nair, Abdur Rahman, Raman Raman, S. K. Sheikuchan, Gurdev Singh. Coach: H P Kohli, Kuldip Chand Chopra (Delhi, UT)

1962 Asian Games squad
Nripjit Singh Bedi, Tilakam Gopal, Joseph, Jai Karan, Khalid, Munnalal, T. P. Padmanabhan Nair, A. Palanisamy, Des Raj, Jaswant Singh. Coach: HP Kohli

1986 Asian Games squad
Jimmy George, K. Udayakumar, Kirtesh Kumar, Sukhpal Singh, Mehar Singh, GE Sridharan, Sandeep Sharma, P. V. Ramana, Dalel Singh, Abdul Basith, Cyril Valloor

2014 Asian Games squad
G. R. Vaishnav, Lavmeet Katariya, Karthik Ashok, Prabagaran, Hardeep Singh, Naveen Raja Jacob, Gurinder Singh, reyant, Jerome Vinit Charles, Mohan Ukkrapandian, Ranjit Singh, Pattani Prabakaran

Managerial history

HP Kohli was considered as the best coach Indian Volleyball team ever had. HP Kohli coached Indian Volleyball team during its golden era of 1950s to 1970s. He expired on 13th Jan, 1980 due to cardiac arrest.

Achutha Kurup was considered as the master tactician who guided India to its last medal at the Asian Games. Kurup was appointed in 1982 ahead of 1982 Asian Games in Delhi, but what brought him fame was a Bronze medal in 1986 Asian Games four years later. Besides the medal in Seoul, Kurup was also at the helm when the Indian team won the silver in an international tournament in Japan in 1989.
Shyam Sunder Rao was appointed as the coach of Indian volleyball team after his success with the Junior national team. With his eyes set on a medal in the 2002 Asian Games, Sunder Rao's side missed an opportunity to end India's medal draught at the Asian Games since 1986, as they missed a place in the semi-finals by one point. However, the team went on to beat Pakistan and Chinese Taipei to finish fifth in the tournament.

Former International Coaches of India 
 Kirtesh Kumar Trivedi was a former coach of Botswanan clubs, namely BDF VI, BPS VI, Mafolofolo Volleyball Club and has also coached the  Botswana National Volleyball Team.

Current technical staff

Team

Current squad
The following is the 2022 Indian national team roster, called up for 2020 Summer Olympics qualification.
Head coach:  G.E. Sridharan

Results and schedule

2022

Competitive record

Summer Olympics
India has never qualified for the summer Olympics.

FIVB World Championship
India has appeared in the FIVB World Championship only twice. They came really close to qualifying in the 2002 qualifiers, missing a place in the World Championship by one spot as they finished third among three best second placed finishers.

Asian Games
During the initial years, India had an immediate success as they clinched 2 bronze medals and a silver medal in their first 7 Asian Games' campaign.

Following a bronze medal in 1986 Asian Games, India did not participate in the next two tournaments due to the controversy in the Federation and the death of Jimmy George. Since then, India has seen a decline in its performance and hasn't won a medal yet.

Asian Volleyball Championship
India has appeared in the finals for 18 times out of 21. Their highest ever finish being in 2005 when they ended up at the fourth place.

Asian Volleyball Cup
India has done well in the recently introduced Asian Cup competition, qualifying for it three times. Their highest ever finish came in the 2014 edition where they beat old rivals Japan in the preliminary stage, Iran in the semi-finals before losing to South Korea in the final. They had to settle for a silver medal which extended their wait for a gold medal at the Asian level since their formation.

South Asian Games
India is the most successful team at the South Asian Games having won an overall number of nine gold medals and two silver medals.

Individual awards

See also
India women's national volleyball team

References

Volleyball in India
National men's volleyball teams
volleyball
Men's sport in India